Blue Skies is the seventh studio album by American actor and singer Seth MacFarlane, released on May 20, 2022, through Republic Records and Verve Records. MacFarlane reunited with his frequent collaborator Joel McNeely to produce the album. The album’s lead single, “No Moon at All”, was released digitally on April 20, 2022.

Background
On April 21, 2022, It was announced that MacFarlane would release his new album the following month. MacFarlane collaborated with Andrew Cottee again, after previously working on his fifth album Once in a While. He recorded the album at Abbey Road Studios, making it his sixth time recording at the studio. MacFarlane said on collaborating with Cottee again, "I have long been a fan of Andrew Cottee’s supremely artful and buoyant orchestrations,” MacFarlane tells Variety. “So after our last collaboration, ‘Once in A While,’ a ballad-themed record, I really wanted to hear what he could do with an up-tempo album." Cottee also said on working with him, "Cottee speaks in terms of raising the bar. “This is the album I’ve always wanted to make. The chance to collaborate with an artist like Seth MacFarlane and work with such a high calibre of players is a dream for any arranger." MacFarlane and Cottee wrote an original song for the album, “Unless I Do It All With You”.

Singles
The album's lead single, "No Moon at All", was released on April 20, 2022.

Track listing

Personnel 
Credits adapted from AllMusic.

 Louis Alter – Composer
 Irving Berlin – Composer
 Rich Breen – Engineer, Mixing
 Lew Brown – Composer
 Johnny Burke – Composer
 Sammy Cahn – Composer
 Jon Cassar – Cover Photo
 Stephano Civetta – Assistant Engineer
 Dave Collins – Mastering
 Andrew Cottee – Arranger, Composer, Conductor
 Duke Ellington – Composer
 Redd Evans – Composer
 Sammy Fain – Composer
 Joy Fehily – Executive Producer
 Mack Gordon – Composer
 Mark Graham – Music Preparation
 Johnny Green – Composer
 Dan Hayden – Assistant Engineer
 James Van Heusen – Composer
 Edward Heyman – Composer
 JoAnn Kane – Music Preparation
 Bronislaw Kaper – Composer
 Frank Loesser – Composer
 Seth MacFarlane –Composer, Primary Artist, Producer, Vocals
 Dave Mann –Composer
 Joel McNeely – Producer
 Sidney D. Mitchell – Composer
 Harry Revel – Composer
 Bob Russell – Composer
 Kristen Sorace – Design
 Dok Stanford – Composer
 Jule Styne – Composer
 Ned Washington – Composer
 Joseph Young – Composer
 Victor Young – Composer

Release history

References 

2022 albums
Seth MacFarlane albums